The Frøken Norge 2011 ("Miss Norway 2011") beauty pageant was held on 27 August 2011 in Storefjell, Gol, Norway.

The eventual winner was 23-year-old Anna Larsen Zahl from Sortland. Anna represented Norway at the 2011 Miss World pageant which was held on 6 November 2011 in London, the United Kingdom. The runner-up was 19-year-old Fay Teresa Vålbekk from Oslo.

There was no winner crowned for Miss Universe this year, as the final was held too late to send the winner to the 2011 edition of the pageant. This marked the first time that Norway was not represented in Miss Universe since 1999.

From over 500 applicants from all over the country, 40 quarter-finalists were chosen to compete in duels. The duel winners, who were announced on 23 May after a round of SMS voting, then made up the 20 semi-finalists. On 8 July, Ine Drikakisi from Oslo was announced as the winner of the Save the Children fast-track competition, and she was therefore guaranteed a spot in the Top 10. The competition was about collecting the most money for the charity in a creative way. The nine girls who would join her competing for the crown the final night were announced on 8 August after another round of voting (40% jury votes, 40% SMS votes, 20% Facebook votes).

Final results

Semi-final Jury
Geir Hamnes, national director of Miss World and Miss Universe in Norway
Kathrine Sørland, Frøken Norge for Miss World 2002, and Miss Universe Norway 2004
Mariann Birkedal, Miss Universe Norway 2008, and Frøken Norge for Miss World 2010
Omer Bhatti, rapper
Bjørn Engberg, partner of the Frøken Norge Organization

Final Jury
Geir Hamnes, national director of Miss World and Miss Universe in Norway
Mariann Birkedal, Miss Universe Norway 2008, and Frøken Norge for Miss World 2010
Lillian Müller, model and actress, and former Playboy Playmate
Carina Dahl, singer and model
Alexx Alexxander, illusionist
Lise Nilsen, choreographer, model and TV presenter
Rolf Ørjan Høgseth, photographer
Odd Rolfsen, coach and motivator
Tina Rismoen, hairdresser and director of the Hairport hair salons
Solvår Hegge, skin therapist

Notes
Iselin Jeanett Eknes (Hordaland) originally made it into the Top 20, but she was disqualified because she passed a certain unknown time limit set by the Frøken Norge Organization. She was replaced by Nerea Hernández Eide (Hordaland).
Ine Drikakisi (Oslo) is half Fijian.
Guro Olaussen (Finnmark) is Sámi.
Nerea Hernández Eide (Hordaland) is half Spanish.
Marion Dyrvik (Møre og Romsdal) was Miss Water (1st runner-up) at Miss Norway 2010. She went on to represent Norway at Miss International 2010.
Three of the girls in the Top 40 are ethnic Albanians: Hedije Tahiri (Buskerud), Nora Muqkurtaj (Oppland), and Arita Fejzulai (Østfold).

References

External links
Frøken Norge official website
Froken.no, Frøken Norge magazine

Miss Norway
2011 beauty pageants
2011 in Norway
Gol, Norway